The 2019 New Democratic Party of Newfoundland and Labrador leadership election was prompted by Gerry Rogers' announcement on February 12, 2019 that she would be resigning from politics. Economist Alison Coffin won by acclamation on March 1, 2019, as she was the only declared candidate. She was confirmed as the party's new leader at a news conference on March 5, 2019.

Timeline
 April 6–8, 2018 - MHA Gerry Rogers is nominated in a leadership convention in St. John's, defeating Alison Coffin.
 February 12, 2019 - Rogers announces her resignation as party leader, effective upon the election of a new leader. Party president Lynn Moore states that the details on the convention would be released the following day. Fellow NDP MHA Lorraine Michael announces she will not be a candidate.
 February 13, 2019 - Alison Coffin declares her candidacy, lawyer Mark Gruchy states he is "seriously giving thought" about running, and Sheilagh O'Leary confirms that she will not be a candidate.
 February 14, 2019 - The New Democratic Party releases the rules and deadlines for their leadership contest.
 March 1, 2019 - Deadline for candidates to be nominated.
 March 5, 2019 - The New Democratic Party holds a leadership conference confirming Coffin as the party's new leader.
 March 10, 2019 - Planned deadline for members to register for the election.
 March 13–16, 2019 - Planned voting that would have been held through email and telephone.

Declared candidates

Alison Coffin
Memorial University economics professor, 2018 leadership candidate for the New Democrats, 2015 candidate in Waterford Valley

Date campaign launched: February 13, 2019
Other prominent supporters: Mark Gruchy, lawyer, 2015 candidate in Cape St. Francis; Kerri Neil, 2018 candidate in Windsor Lake by-election

Declined to run
 Jim Dinn, former president of the Newfoundland and Labrador Teachers' Association
 Mark Gruchy,  lawyer, 2015 candidate in Cape St. Francis (endorsed Alison Coffin)
Lorraine Michael, former MHA for St. John's East-Quidi Vidi (2006–2019), former Leader of the New Democratic Party of Newfoundland and Labrador (2006-2015), former interim Leader of the New Democratic Party of Newfoundland and Labrador (2017-2018)
Sheilagh O'Leary, Deputy Mayor of St. John's (2017–present), 2014 candidate in Virginia Waters

See also 
 New Democratic Party of Newfoundland and Labrador
 1989 New Democratic Party of Newfoundland and Labrador leadership election
 2006 New Democratic Party of Newfoundland and Labrador leadership election
 2015 New Democratic Party of Newfoundland and Labrador leadership election
 2018 New Democratic Party of Newfoundland and Labrador leadership election
 Next New Democratic Party of Newfoundland and Labrador leadership election

References

2019
2019 elections in Canada
2019 in Newfoundland and Labrador
March 2019 events in Canada
New Democratic Party of Newfoundland and Labrador leadership election